Sexus (Latin for sex) may refer to:

 Sexus (The Rosy Crucifixion), a 1949 novel by Henry Miller
 "Sexus", a 1984 single by Crispy Ambulance
 Sexus, a 1990s English synthpop duo linked to the Romo movement